Punjabi Adab Vichaar is a well-known book on Punjabi literature as well as a help-guide for students of Punjabi language and literature in Pakistan. The book is written by Lalamusa-based writer Chaudhry Yasir Zaman. The book covers both poetry and prose in Punjabi literature. It was first published in December 2013 and a second revised edition was published on 20 August 2015.

Books about literature
Punjabi literature